Alexander Cross was a Scottish politician.

Alexander Cross may also refer to:

Alexander Cross (Canadian judge) of the Quebec Court of Queen's Bench, 18771892, Cushing v. Dupuy
Sir Alexander Cross, 3rd Baronet (1880–1963), of the Cross baronets
Alex Cross, fictional character
Alexander Cross (1903–1976), actor from Wales, UK, starring in the 1937 film Texas Trail

See also
Cross (surname)